Linda van de Berg is a former Dutch track racing cyclist. She became national track cycling champion in the individual pursuit in 1986.

References

External links

Living people
Dutch female cyclists
Place of birth missing (living people)
Cyclists from Amsterdam
Dutch track cyclists
Year of birth missing (living people)